Miroslav Buljan (born December 18, 1955) is Croatian retired professional football manager and former player. He particularly managed various Croatian clubs in the 1.HNL, 2.HNL, and 3.HNL, as well as Široki Brijeg in the Bosnian Premier League.

Playing career
Born in Slavonski Brod, SFR Yugoslavia, present day Croatia, Buljan began playing football in the youth levels of hometown club Marsonia in 1964. In 1974, he joined the youth team of Dinamo Zagreb, but a year later, in 1975, he signed his first professional contract with Marsonia, and played at the club until 1983.

Managerial career
During his tenure as a player with Marsonia, Buljan managed to achieve a UEFA coaching license, and received his first coaching experience in 1996 with Marsonia in the 1. HNL. Following the relegation of Marsonia he remained in the top tier after managing Slaven Belupo in 1997. In 1999, Buljan went to Bosnia and Herzegovina t0 manage Široki Brijeg.

After two seasons at Šrioki Brijeg, he returned to Croatia where he had several managerial stints in the 3. HNL with Sloga, Karlovac, and Ogulin. In 2006, Buljan began managing in the 2. HNL with Belišće, and with Koprivnica in 2007. He went abroad once more in 2008 to the Canadian Soccer League to manage Toronto Croatia. In 2010, he returned to the 2. HNL where he managed MV Croatia. Buljan was appointed manager in 2011 of King Faisal Babes in the Ghanaian Premier League. After a season in Africa, he returned to MV Croatia and managed the club in 2012.

References

1955 births
Living people
Sportspeople from Slavonski Brod
Association football midfielders
Yugoslav footballers
NK Marsonia players
Croatian football managers
NK Marsonia managers
NK Slaven Belupo managers
NK Široki Brijeg managers
NK Karlovac managers
NK Belišće managers
Toronto Croatia managers
King Faisal Babes F.C. managers
Croatian Football League managers
Premier League of Bosnia and Herzegovina managers
Canadian Soccer League (1998–present) managers
Croatian expatriate football managers
Expatriate football managers in Bosnia and Herzegovina
Croatian expatriate sportspeople in Bosnia and Herzegovina
Expatriate soccer managers in Canada
Croatian expatriate sportspeople in Canada
Expatriate football managers in Ghana
Croatian expatriate sportspeople in Ghana